The post of Surveyor of the Fabric of St Paul's Cathedral was established in 1675. The role is an architectural one, with the current holder being responsible for the upkeep and maintenance of the cathedral and its buildings. In the past, the role has involved overseeing new construction work as well as restoration and architectural conservation. The post has been held by the following people:

Christopher Wren (1675–1723)
John James (1723–1746)
Henry Flitcroft (1746–1756)
Stiff Leadbetter (1756–1766)
Robert Mylne (1766-1811)
Samuel Pepys Cockerell (1811–1819)
Charles Robert Cockerell (1819–1852)
Francis Penrose (1852–1897)
Somers Clarke (1897–1906)
Mervyn Edmund Macartney (1906–1931)
Walter Godfrey Allen (1931–1956)
John Seely, Lord Mottistone (1956–1963)
Paul Edward Paget (1963–1969)
Bernard Feilden (1969–1977)
Robert Potter (1978–1984)
William Whitfield (1985–1990)
Martin Stancliffe (1990–2011)
Oliver Caroe (2011–present)

Notes

References

Further reading
For a fuller history of the 20th-century surveyorships, see Peter Burman's 'Decoration, Furnishings and Art since 1900', forming chapter 23 of St. Paul's: The Cathedral Church of London, 604–2004 (2004)
For more on the history of the surveyorships, see the lecture 'St Paul's at 300', given at Gresham College in two parts in November 2011 by the retiring surveyor Martin Stancliffe (Part 1 and Part 2)

St Paul's Cathedral
St Paul's Cathedral